Maiken Caspersen Falla (born 13 August 1990) is a Norwegian former cross-country skier who specialized in sprint and short-distance races. She is the 2014 Olympic champion in the individual sprint and three-time Olympic medalist. She became the individual sprint World champion at the 2017 FIS Nordic World Ski Championships and successfully defended her World title in 2019. Falla won a total of five gold, one silver and four bronze medals at the World Championships in her career and she is the most medalled skier in the individual sprint discipline in the Championship history with five medals. Winner of three consecutive Sprint World Cup crystal globes, Falla's highest finish in the overall World Cup standings was sixth-place which she achieved in 2014–15 and 2015–16 World Cup seasons.

With 22 World Cup sprint victories, Falla is the second-most successful female World Cup sprinter of all time, only behind Marit Bjørgen. She also shares the record of most sprint victories in a single season with Petra Majdič at eight victories.

She announced her retirement from cross-country skiing in April 2022.

Career
Falla made her World Cup debut with a classical sprint race in Kuusamo on 29 November 2008, where she finished in 22nd place. She reached her first World Cup podium in Düsseldorf in her second ever World Cup race. With that promising start, Falla was given a spot in the individual sprint race at the 2009 FIS Nordic World Ski Championships in Liberec, but she failed to qualify for the quarter-finals by finishing 39th in qualifying round. After a podium appearance in her rookie season, Falla could not make the World Cup podium for more than two years. During that span, her sixth-place finish at the classical sprint in Kuusamo helped her to secure a spot in the Norwegian Olympic team for the 2010 Winter Olympics in Vancouver. At the Olympics, she finished 20th in the individual sprint event.

Falla returned to World Cup podium in 2010/11 season with a third place at the classical sprint in Otepää, then she backed up that performance with a second-place finish in Drammen. With two podiums in the last two sprints prior to the 2011 FIS Nordic World Ski Championships, she became one of the medal favorites in the upcoming home World Championships in Oslo Holmenkollen. At the World Championships, after setting the third fastest time in the qualification Falla took a fall in her quarter final heat and eliminated from the competition in that stage after finishing third in the heat. After the disappointment in the individual sprint, Falla was not initially considered for the team sprint but after the withdrawal of Marit Bjørgen, she was selected for the event alongside Astrid Uhrenholdt Jacobsen and the pair went on to take a bronze medal behind the Swedish and Finnish teams.

In 2011/12 season, Falla won her first World Cup victory in a freestyle sprint race in Rogla, Slovenia. She also reached four more podiums during the season and finished the season in second place in sprint rankings behind Kikkan Randall.

Falla started 2012/13 season in very good form with one victory and three podiums from her first three sprint races. She also reached a podium in a distance race for the first time, a 10 km mass start race in Canmore, but her level dropped after mid-January, and she could not make a single top 10 in the remainder of the World Cup season. Despite the decrease in performance, at the 2013 FIS Nordic World Ski Championships in Val di Fiemme, Falla won her first individual World Championship medal with a bronze medal in the individual sprint event. For the team sprint race she teamed up with Ingvild Flugstad Østberg but the pair missed the medals and finished in fourth place mainly due to Østberg’s fall in the penultimate leg of the race.

Falla has not started well to 2013/14 season and she managed to reach only one podium in World Cup sprints before the Olympics. At the 2014 Winter Olympics in Sochi Falla won the gold medal in individual sprint despite more than one year without a victory in the World Cup. She dominated the event from start to finish by setting the fastest time in the qualifying round and winning every heat she competed. She was left out in the team sprint since her teammates Marit Bjørgen and Ingvild Flugstad Østberg has shown better performance in classical discipline throughout the season. Although the reason was understandable for many, some people – including Bente Skari – criticized the decision of putting Bjørgen into the team instead of Olympic champion Falla. After the Olympics, Falla earned her sole World Cup victory of the season in the prestigious classical sprint race in Drammen.

In 2014/15 season, Falla recorded four World Cup podiums and her only victory of the season once again came in Drammen. She finished the season in third place in sprint rankings behind her teammates Bjørgen and Østberg. At the 2015 FIS Nordic World Ski Championships in Falun, Falla earned her first World Championship gold medal in the team sprint event with Østberg, but once again she had to settle for bronze medal in the individual sprint behind Marit Bjørgen and Stina Nilsson.

Falla's best season to date in terms of wins came in 2015/16 season. She was the dominant force in sprint races of the World cup throughout the season by winning eight of eleven sprint races, she participated in and missed the podium only once in the entire season. That came in Planica where she was dealing with illness. With eight sprint victories, Falla equaled the Petra Majdič’s record of most World Cup sprint victories in a single season. At the end of the season she clinched the seasonal sprint World Cup title for the first time in her career.

In 2016/17 season, Falla defended her sprint World Cup title despite being outsprinted by Sweden's Stina Nilsson in most of the sprint races. Although Falla has only one sprint victory compared to Nilsson's six, she took the advantage in sprint rankings when Nilsson opted not to ski in Toblach and she maintained it until the end of the season. At the 2017 FIS Nordic World Ski Championships in Lahti, Falla took the gold medal in the individual sprint in a similar fashion to her Olympic title and won the only sprint title that has eluded her in her career. She set the fastest time in the qualification and won every heat she competed during the process, while her archrival Nilsson was disqualified in the semifinal. By winning the gold medal, she became the second female skier to win Olympic, World and World Cup sprint title after her compatriot Marit Bjørgen who reached that triple crown in 2010 but Falla has the distinction of holding those three honours at the same time. During the championships, Falla added two more gold medals to her medal tally and finished the championships with three gold medals. Along with Heidi Weng, she once again brought the World team sprint title to Norway. She was also the member of the Norwegian relay team that won the gold medal in 4 × 5 km relay, running the opening classical leg.

Personal life
Falla resides in Lillehammer along with her partner Kristian Hågensen Aune, a former football player who has served as a captain for the Norwegian club Levanger FK. Her twin brother Marius Caspersen Falla is also a cross-country skier.

Cross-country skiing results
All results are sourced from the International Ski Federation (FIS).

Olympic Games
 3 medals – (1 gold, 1 silver, 1 bronze)

World Championships
 10 medals – (5 gold, 1 silver, 4 bronze)

World Cup

Season titles
 3 titles – (3 sprint)

Season standings

Individual podiums
 22 victories – (16 , 6 ) 
 55 podiums – (39 , 15 )

Team podiums
 6 victories – (2 , 4 ) 
 15 podiums – (2 , 13 )

Overall record

a.  Classification is made according to FIS classification.
b.  Includes individual and mass start races.

References

External links

  
 
 
 
 

1990 births
Cross-country skiers at the 2010 Winter Olympics
Cross-country skiers at the 2014 Winter Olympics
Cross-country skiers at the 2018 Winter Olympics
Cross-country skiers at the 2022 Winter Olympics
Living people
Norwegian female cross-country skiers
Olympic cross-country skiers of Norway
People from Akershus
FIS Nordic World Ski Championships medalists in cross-country skiing
Tour de Ski skiers
Medalists at the 2014 Winter Olympics
Medalists at the 2018 Winter Olympics
Olympic gold medalists for Norway
Olympic silver medalists for Norway
Olympic bronze medalists for Norway
Olympic medalists in cross-country skiing
People from Fet
Sportspeople from Viken (county)